Blue Swallow is a 2005 South Korean film based on the true story of Park Kyung-won, an early Korean female pilot. The film became controversial when Park's alleged pro-Japanese activities came to light. It was also found that she was not, as the filmmakers had thought, the first female pilot from Korea; this distinction in fact belonged to Kwon Ki-ok of the Republic of China Air Force. Despite excellent reviews and Park's biographer pointing out factual errors in these accusations, it resulted in the under-performance of Blue Swallow at the box office.

Cast 
 Jang Jin-young ... Park Kyung-won
 Kim Joo-hyuk ... Han Ji-hyeok
 Yu Min ... Masako Kibe
 Han Ji-min ... Lee Jeong-hee
 Tōru Nakamura ... Flight instructor
 Takeo Nakahara ... Foreign Minister
 Kim Tae-hyun ... Kang Se-gi
 Ko Joo-yeon ... Park Kyung-won as a child
 Kim Gi-cheon

Awards and nominations 
2006 Baeksang Arts Awards
Nominated - Best Actress: Jang Jin-young

2006 Grand Bell Awards
Best Music: Michael Staudacher
Best Sound: Eun Hee-soo
Nominated - Best Actress: Jang Jin-young
Nominated - Best New Actress: Han Ji-min
Nominated - Best Cinematography: Yoon Hong-sik
Nominated - Best Lighting: Choi Seok-jae
Nominated - Best Art Direction: Takeuchi Koichi
Nominated - Best Costume Design: Kwon Yu-jin
Nominated - Best Visual Effects: Kang Jong-ik, Han Tae-jeong

2006 Korean Film Awards
Nominated - Best Cinematography: Yoon Hong-sik
Nominated - Best Art Direction: Takeuchi Koichi
Nominated - Best Sound: Eun Hee-soo
Nominated - Best Visual Effects: Kang Jong-ik, Han Tae-jeong

2006 Korean Association of Film Critics Awards
Best Actress: Jang Jin-young
Best Cinematography: Yoon Hong-sik

References

External links 
 
 
 

2005 films
South Korean biographical films
2000s Japanese-language films
2000s Korean-language films
South Korean aviation films
Films directed by Yoon Jong-chan
Biographical action films
Films set in Korea under Japanese rule
2005 multilingual films
South Korean multilingual films
2000s South Korean films